Park Ho-young (born 7 April 1999) is a South Korean footballer currently playing as a defender for Busan IPark.

Career statistics

Club

References

1999 births
Living people
South Korean footballers
Association football defenders
K League 2 players
Busan IPark players